Sali Vercellese is a comune (municipality) in the Province of Vercelli in the Italian region Piedmont, located about  northeast of Turin and about  southwest of Vercelli.

Sali Vercellese borders the following municipalities: Lignana, Salasco, and Vercelli.

References

Cities and towns in Piedmont